Screamer is an racing video game for MS-DOS compatible operating systems. The game uses texture mapped polygon-modelled tracks and cars and shares some elements with Namco's 1993 Ridge Racer. A sequel, Screamer 2, was released in 1996.

GOG.com released an emulated version for Windows in 2009 and Mac OS X in 2012.

Gameplay

Development
Software rendering is used in the game, unlike Screamers three sequels Screamer 2, Screamer Rally and Screamer 4x4, that all utilized 3D hardware (in the case of Screamer 2, after a patch was released.) As a result, Screamer was one of the early games to really require a Pentium processor to run at full speed, particularly in SVGA mode. A special 3D accelerated version was available with the Number Nine Reality 332FX graphics card, that utilized the S3 ViRGE chipset.

The game's music was composed by Allister Brimble.

Reception
A reviewer for Maximum commended the game for its high speed, replay sequences, smoothly scrolling graphics, selection of vehicles, numerous modes and options, overall high longevity, and low price point. He noted that the computer-controlled opponents follow a fixed course, and would even crash full speed into the player car rather than deviate from that course, but did not feel this was a bad thing. He gave the game 5 out of 5 stars. A reviewer for Next Generation was also pleased with the graphics, selection of vehicles, and numerous modes. He praised the game for being more accessible than most racers, allowing players to begin racing without having to figure out the car's technical aspects, though he also criticized it as being "simplistic". He scored it 4 out of 5 stars, concluding that "there may not be a lot to it, but the graphics, playability, and selection of cars with their different qualities make it a title worthy of a look".

The editors of Computer Games Magazine nominated Screamer as the best racing game of 2001, but ultimately gave the award to NASCAR Racing 4.

An advertisement for the game, showing a burnt-out car wreckage with the slogan "Every Christmas the roads are full of mad men. Join them", aroused public outcry.

References

External links

1995 video games
DOS games
Games commercially released with DOSBox
MacOS games
Racing video games
Video games developed in Italy
Video games scored by Allister Brimble
Virgin Interactive games
Windows games
Single-player video games